In Australian rules football, injuries are common and consistent due to the nature of the game as a contact sport. The Anterior cruciate ligament (ACL) knee injury is one of the three major and common injuries which occur in the sport.  The ACL injury can have long-term effects on the player, not only in physical activity but also in their own daily lives in the future. Studies have attempted to understand and find prevention techniques for ACL injuries, but the scarcity of data precludes any conclusions for male athletes. Female athletes, however, have shown reductions in the rate of ACL injuries through the use of strength training and technique improvement. Once a player has injured their ACL, there is a very high possibility that the injury can occur again to the same knee. There is also the chance of the opposite knee being injured due to the player protecting the reconstructed knee.

Structure of the knee and the ACL

An ACL rupture is the most common injury that takes place in the knee. The ACL is very small; the average length is 38mm and only 11mm wide. The knee is formed by the connection of the femur (upper leg bone) and the tibia (lower leg bone) with another two bones been the fibula (small bone next to the tibia) and the patella (the kneecap). Within these two main bones tendons attach the bones to the muscles that give the knee movement, while the ligaments provide the knee with stability.  The ACL looks like a mixture of an oval and triangle shape, and is located in a very compact area within the knee. The ACL fibres are in place to give direction for the knee to move, such as a kicking or twisting motion. If an ACL rupture occurs, it immediately forces an increase not only to the anterior tibial translation but also the internal tibial rotation. This is because, as the femur is pushed back to rotate, trauma is caused to the knee due to a lack of stabilisation. The ACL is there to create rotational stability within the knee to be able to produce different motions. Importantly, the ACL restrains the anterior tibial translation, providing 85–87% total restraining force.

Cause of injury
While Australian rules is a contact sport, not every ACL injury occurs due to contact. Studies show that out of 34 ACL injuries assessed, 56% of injuries were due to no-contact situations. These studies showed that ACL injuries occur most of the time due to type of movement, change of direction resulting in the knee giving way, speed of player, angle of knee when landing and lack of stability. Australian footballers typically wear boots with studs on their soles; this creates grip and friction between the player and the surface. Although boots help the player play football, they also increase risk of injury to the ACL.

Angle of the knee
The process of an ACL injury where no contact from a player is applied is mostly due to the player landing after jumping for a mark. The nature and severity of the injury is impacted by the hardness of the ground, the quality of the grass and how well the player lands.

Lack of stability
Lack of stability in the knee is a main cause of ACL ruptures. Most advanced athletes struggle to gain enough stability within the knee while exercising, causing the possibility of injury.

Prevention
While there is no guaranteed way to stop an ACL injury from occurring, there are ways to lower the risk. Once an athlete has had an ACL injury, it is often extremely difficult to return to football. This is exacerbated by the risk of further ACL injuries, which is much higher after the first injury. Due to these risks, building strong muscles and bones is considered highly beneficial for Australian rules footballers.  Small doses of training can help prevent ACL injuries as it helps avoid overtraining, which often causes fatigue and soreness. These small doses of training should include strength, balance, plyometrics or agility to achieve best results in avoiding an ACL injury.

Recovery 
After an injury, it is important that the player recovers properly. Recovery includes rest, low activity, diet, strength and training. Balance is a useful way of preventing ACL injuries as it builds strength within the knee. Studies have also found the knee is strengthened by training focussed on jumping, landing, posture and changes of direction. Balance is the ability to maintain the centre of mass of a body within the base of support. The two types of balance are static (the ability to control one's body while in a stationary position) and dynamic (the ability to control one's body while moving). When trying to understand balance, it is important to acknowledge three factors: mass, the area of the base of support, and the position of the centre of gravity. Balance evolves around the base of support as well as the centre of gravity. For an injured footballer to obtain maximal benefits from this training, they should work on their balance consistently to build strength within both knees and around the body.

References 

Australian rules football
Sports injuries